Mitja Novinič (born 10 April 1991) is a Slovenian footballer who plays as a midfielder for Nafta 1903.

Club career

Early career 
Novinič joined Italian club Milan from Nafta Lendava in June 2007. He spent four seasons in the club's youth system and was a member of the under-20 side who won the Coppa Italia Primavera in 2010, 25 years after the club's last success in the competition.

Novinič was also called-up a couple of times for first-team games since 2009, but eventually he was never fielded nor named on the bench.

Lanciano 
For the 2011–12 season, Novinič was loaned out to Prima Divisione club Virtus Lanciano. He made his official debut for the club on 7 August 2011, in the first preliminary round of the Coppa Italia against Castel Girone, coming off the bench in the second half, as Lanciano lost 2–1. He went on to make 12 league appearances, as Lanciano won promotion to Serie B through the play-offs.

Teramo 
At the beginning of the 2012–13 season, Novinič was sent on loan to Seconda Divisione club Teramo.

References

External links 
 Profile at aic.football.it 
 Profile at NZS 

1991 births
Living people
People from Lendava
Slovenian footballers
Association football midfielders
Slovenian expatriate footballers
Slovenian expatriate sportspeople in Italy
Expatriate footballers in Italy
NK Nafta Lendava players
A.C. Milan players
S.S. Virtus Lanciano 1924 players
S.S. Teramo Calcio players
Slovenian expatriate sportspeople in Germany
Expatriate footballers in Germany
Slovenian Second League players
Slovenia youth international footballers
Slovenia under-21 international footballers